All railway lines in Belgium are identified by a route number and these numbers are in widespread general use (for example, in passenger train timetables). Most of the numbers have remained unchanged since the creation of the SNCB/NMBS in the 1920s, although line closures and the construction of new routes have led to a few alterations over the years.

Lines currently used by passenger train services
 Line 0: Brussels-North - Brussels-South
 HSL 1: France - Brussels-South
 HSL 2: Leuven - Ans (Liège)
 HSL 3: Liège-Guillemins - Aachen (Germany)
 HSL 4: Antwerpen-Centraal - Breda (Netherlands)
 Line 12: Antwerpen-Centraal - Roosendaal (Netherlands)
 Line 13: Kontich - Lier
 Line 15: Antwerpen - Hasselt
 Line 16: Lier - Aarschot
 Line 19: Mol - Weert (Netherlands)
 Line 21: Landen - Hasselt
 Line 21A: Hasselt - Genk
 Line 25: Brussels-North - Antwerpen-Centraal
 Line 25N: Schaarbeek - Mechelen
 Line 26: Schaerbeek - Halle
 Line 27: Brussels-North - Antwerpen
 Line 27B: Weerde - Mechelen-Nekkerspoel
 Line 28: Schaerbeek - Brussels-South
 Line 29: Herentals - Turnhout
 Line 34: Hasselt - Liège-Guillemins
 Line 35: Leuven - Hasselt
 Line 36: Brussels-North - Liège-Guillemins
 Line 36A
 Line 36C: Zaventem - Brussels Airport
 Line 36C/1
 Line 36C/2
 Line 36N
 Line 37: Liège-Guillemins - Aachen (Germany)
 Line 40: Liège-Guillemins - Maastricht (Netherlands)
 Line 42: Rivage - Gouvy
 Line 43: Angleur (Liège) - Marloie
 Line 44: Pepinster - Spa-Géronstère
 Line 49: Welkenraedt - Eupen
 Line 50: Brussels-North - Gent-Sint-Pieters
 Line 50A: Brussels-South - Oostende
 Line 51: Bruges - Blankenberge
 Line 51A: Bruges - Zeebrugge
 Line 51B: Bruges - Knokke
 Line 52: Antwerp - Dendermonde
 Line 53: Schellebelle - Leuven
 Line 54: Mechelen - Sint-Niklaas
 Line 57: Dendermonde - Lokeren
 Line 58: Ghent - Maldegem
 Line 59: Antwerp - Ghent
 Line 60: Jette - Dendermonde
 Line 66: Bruges - Kortrijk
 Line 69: Kortrijk - Poperinge
 Line 73: Deinze - De Panne
 Line 75: Ghent - Lille (France)
 Line 75A: Mouscron - Tournai
 Line 78: Saint-Ghislain - Tournai
 Line 82: Aalst - Zottegem
 Line 86: Ronse - De Pinte
 Line 89: Kortrijk - Denderleeuw
 Line 90: Denderleeuw - Jurbise
 Line 94: Halle - Lille (France)
 Line 96: Brussels-South - Quévy
 Line 97: Mons - Quiévrain
 Line 108: La Louvière - Binche
 Line 112: La Louvière - Charleroi
 Line 116: La Louvière - Manage
 Line 117: Luttre - Braine-le-Comte
 Line 118: La Louvière - Mons
 Line 122: Melle - Geraardsbergen
 Line 123: Geraardsbergen - Enghien
 Line 124: Brussels-South - Charleroi-South
 Line 125: Namur - Liège-Guillemins
 Line 130: Namur - Charleroi-South
 Line 130A: Charleroi-South - Jeumont (France)
 Line 132: Mariembourg - Charleroi-South
 Line 134: Mariembourg - Couvin
 Line 139: Leuven - Ottignies
 Line 140: Ottignies - Charleroi-South
 Line 144: Gembloux - Jemeppe-sur-Sambre
 Line 154: Namur - Dinant
 Line 161: Brussels-North - Namur
 Line 161D: Ottignies - Louvain-la-Neuve
 Line 162: Namur - Luxembourg
 Line 165: Libramont - Athus
 Line 166: Dinant - Bertrix
 Line 167: Arlon - Athus

See also
 National Railway Company of Belgium
 Infrabel
 List of Belgian railway services
 Belgian Railways (disambiguation)

External links
 Belrail.be

Belgium
 
Lines